The Tili is Hindu caste, found in the state of Bihar and West Bengal in India. They are one of the fourteen castes belonging to 'Nabasakh' group. Tilis are considered as General caste.

History and origin

The Tili caste belongs to West Bengal and Bihar. Tilis speak in Angika (Regional language of the then Ang Pradesh in Mahabharata) and Bengali. Tilis are now found mainly in Bhagalpur and Banka District and also in major parts of West Bengal .

Present circumstances

The Tilis have two sub-divisions, the Kashyap (Dadash) and the Sandil (Ekadash). They maintain the custom of clan exogamy. The Tilis are cultivators, and have customs similar to other neighbouring Hindu communities such as the Yadav, Kurmi and Sadgop. However in late 1990s, this caste is being linked with Kurmi specially in Bihar because of their main dependency on agriculture and allied activities same as Kurmi. This association is still not widely known but association is being strengthened due to frequent marriage treating themselves at par with Kurmi. Like many other Hindu communities, they have their own caste association, the Tili Samaj, which acts as a welfare association for the community.

See also

Turha

References

Social groups of Bihar
Social groups of West Bengal
Indian castes